John Conlon (born 23 January 1989) is an Irish hurler who plays for Clare Senior Championship club Clonlara and is the captain of the Clare senior hurling team. He usually lines out as a full-forward.

Playing career

St. Flannan's College

Conlon played in all grades of hurling with St. Flannan's College in Ennis before progressing onto the college's senior team. On 12 March 2006, he was introduced as a substitute when St. Flannan's College suffered a 2-08 to 0-12 defeat by Midleton CBS Secondary School in the Harty Cup final. On 1 May 2006, Conlon broke onto the starting fifteen when he was selected at full-forward for the All-Ireland final against Dublin Colleges. He scored a point from play in the 1-11 to 0-11 defeat.

On 11 March 2007, Conlon lined out at full-forward when St. Flannan's College faced De La Salle College from Waterford in the Harty Cup final. He top scored with 0-08 but ended the game on the losing side after a 2-07 to 0-11 defeat.

NUI Galway

As a student at NUI Galway, Conlon joined the university's senior hurling team and lined out in several Fitzgibbon Cup campaigns. On 6 March 2010, he lined out at right wing-forward when NUI Galway faced the Waterford Institute of Technology in the Fitzgibbon Cup final. Conlon scored the winning point in the 82nd minute and collected a winners' medal after the 1-1 to 1-16 extra-time victory.

Clonlara

Conlon joined the Clonlara club at a young age and played in all grades at juvenile and underage levels. He had already joined the club's senior team when he won a Clare Under-21 Championship medal in 2008.

On 28 October 2007, Conlon won a Clare Inetrmediate Championship medal following Clonlara's 1-21 to 1-18 defeat of Killanena in the final. On 25 November 2007, he scored 1-03 when Clonlara claimed the Munster Club Championship after a 1-14 to 1-08 defeat of Drom-Athlacca in the final.

On 26 October 2008, Conlon was selected at right wing-forward when Clonlara qualified for their first Clare Senior Championship final in 89 years. He scored two points from play and ended the game with a winners' medal after the 1-12 to 1-09 defeat of Newmarket-on-Fergus. 

Conlon was again selected at right wing-forward when Clonlara qualified for a second successive final on 1 November 2009. He scored a point from play but ended the game on the losing side after the 3-05 to 1-09 defeat by first-time winners Cratloe.

On 11 October 2015, Conlon lined out at centre-back when Clonlara faced Sixmilebridge in the final. He ended the game on the losing side for the second time in his career after a 1-21 to 0-15 defeat.

On 16 October 2016, Conlon captained the team from right corner-forward when Clonlara faced Ballyea in the final. He scored a point from play in the 1-11 apiece draw. Conlon was switched to full-forward for the replay on 30 October 2016. He scored 1-01 from play but ended the game on the losing side after a 2-14 to 1-14 defeat.

Clare

Minor and under-21

Conlon first played for Clare as a member of the minor team during the 2006 Munster Championship. He made his first appearance for the team on 5 April 2006 when he lined out at left wing-forward in a 2-13 to 1-08 defeat by Tipperary.

Conlon was eligible for the minor grade for a second successive season in 2007. He played his final game in the grade on 27 June 2007 when he scored a point from play in a 1-20 to 0-14 defeat by Cork.

On 20 July 2008, Conlon made his first appearance for the Clare under-21 team. He scored a two points in the 1-20 to 1-11 defeat of Cork. On 30 July 2008, Conlon lined out at right wing-forward when Clare faced Tipperary in the Munster final. He scored two points from play but ended the game on the losing side after a controversial 1-16 to 2-12 defeat by Tipperary.

Conlon was appointed captain of the Clare under-21 team in advance of the 2009 Munster Championship. On 29 July 2009, he captained the team from right wing-forward to a Munster final appearance against Waterford. Conlon ended the game with a Munster Championship medal after the 2-17 to 2-12 victory. On 13 September 2009, he again captained the team when Clare faced Kilkenny in the All-Ireland final. Conlon scored three points from play and collected a winners' medal after the 0-15 to 0-14 victory.

Conlon was eligible for the under-21 team for a third and final season in 2010. He played his last game for the team on 28 July 2010 when Clare suffered a 1-22 to 1-17 defeat by Tipperary in the Munster final.

Senior

Conlon was drafted onto the Clare senior team in advance of the 2009 National League. He made his first appearance for the team on 8 February 2009 when he was introduced as a substitute for Barry Nugent in a 3-13 to 1-18 first round defeat by Limerick. On 21 June 2009, Conlon made his Munster Championship debut when he was again introduced as a substitute in a 3-18 to 1-22 defeat by Tipperary.

On 7 April 2012, Conlon lined out at left corner-forward when Clare faced Limerick in the National League Division 1B final. He scored a point from play and claimed his first silverware at senior level after the 0-21 to 1-16 victory.

On 8 September 2013, Conlon was selected at right wing-forward when Clare qualified to play Cork in the All-Ireland final. He scored two points from play in the 0-25 to 3-16 draw. The replay on 28 September 2013 also saw Conlon scored two points from right wing-forward before collecting a winners' medal following the 5-16 to 3-16 victory.

Conlon was a regular starter during Clare's 2016 National League success, however, he missed the drawn final and the replay victory over Waterford after sustaining ankle ligament damage in the semi-final victory over Kilkenny.

On 9 July 2017, Conlon was selected at left wing-forward for his first Munster final appearance. He scored two points from play but ended the game on the losing side after Clare suffered a 1-25 to 1-20 defeat by Cork.

Conlon was selected at full-forward when Clare faced Cork in a second successive Munster final on 1 July 2018. He scored five points from play but ended on the losing side after a 2-24 to 3-19 defeat. Conlon ended the season by collecting his first GAA-GPA All-Star award.

Conlon was appointed captain of the Clare senior team for the 2020 season.

Career statistics

Honours

NUI Galway
 Fitzgibbon Cup (1) 2010

Clonlara
 Clare Senior Hurling Championship (1) 2008
 Munster Intermediate Club Hurling Championship (1) 2007
 Clare Intermediate Hurling Championship (1) 2007

Clare
 All-Ireland Senior Hurling Championship (1): 2013
 National Hurling League Division 1 (1) 2016
 National Hurling League Division 1B (1) 2012
 All-Ireland Under-21 Hurling Championship (1) 2009
 Munster Under-21 Hurling Championship (1) 2009

Awards
GAA GPA All Stars Awards (1): 2018

References

1989 births
Living people
University of Galway hurlers
Clonlara hurlers
Clare inter-county hurlers
Alumni of the University of Galway
Irish schoolteachers